The 1969 Stanford Indians football team represented Stanford University during the 1969 NCAA University Division football season. The Indians were coached by John Ralston in his seventh season, matching Tiny Thornhill for the second-longest tenure of any Stanford coach to date. Stanford was led by future Heisman Trophy winner Jim Plunkett in his second season as starting quarterback.

Schedule

Source:

Players drafted by the NFL

References

Stanford
Stanford Cardinal football seasons
Stanford Indians football